Andreas Behm (28 November 1962 – 27 December 2021) was a German weightlifter.

Behm competed at the 1992 and 1996 Summer Olympics in the lightweight category and finished in third and tenth place, respectively. Between 1981 and 1993 he won two gold, three silver and six bronze medals at European and world championships. On 7 July 1984, he set three world records, one in clean & jerk and two in the total. He competed until age 36 and then worked as a coach.

He died from a heart attack on 27 December 2021, at the age of 59. His son Robby is also a weightlifter.

References

External links
 
 
 
 
 

1962 births
2021 deaths
German male weightlifters
Olympic weightlifters of Germany
Olympic bronze medalists for Germany
Olympic medalists in weightlifting
Weightlifters at the 1992 Summer Olympics
Weightlifters at the 1996 Summer Olympics
Medalists at the 1992 Summer Olympics
European champions in weightlifting
European Weightlifting Championships medalists
People from Stralsund
Sportspeople from Mecklenburg-Western Pomerania
20th-century German people